Woo Chan-yang (born 27 April 1997) is a South Korean football defender who plays for Pohang Steelers and the South Korea national under-20 football team.

Club career 
Woo joined Pohang Steelers in 2016 and made his league debut against Gwangju FC on 3 July 2016.

International career 
He has been a member of the South Korea national U-20 team since 2015.

Club career statistics

References

External links 
 

1997 births
Living people
Association football defenders
South Korean footballers
Pohang Steelers players
K League 1 players
South Korea under-20 international footballers